Shubhneet Singh better known by his stage name Shubh is a singer and rapper who works predominantly in Punjabi music. He rose to mainstream in 2021 with his single "We Rollin". His singles have charted on the UK Asian and UK Punjabi charts published by the Official Charts Company, as well as the Official New Zealand Chart. His single "Baller" charted on the Billboard Canadian Hot 100. He has a large fan following within the Sikh diaspora across Canada, United Kingdom, United States, and Australia.

Discography

As lead artist

As featured artist

References 

Living people
Punjabi rappers
Punjabi-language singers
Indian singer-songwriters
Indian hip hop singers
Canadian singer-songwriters
Canadian hip hop singers
Desi musicians
1992 births